"Fire" is the debut single by South Korean girl group 2NE1. The song was released to digital outlets on May 6, 2009 by YG Entertainment, as the lead single for the group's self-titled debut extended play. Despite the group having appeared alongside labelmate Big Bang for the promotional single "Lollipop" in March 2009, "Fire" served as 2NE1's official debut. The song nevertheless became a hit in all Korean charts following its release and instantly gained success in South Korea, propelling the group to immediate fame.

"Fire" was met with positive reviews from music critics, who complemented its musical styles and 2NE1's charisma. Retrospectively, the song is recognized for its role in the expansion of the "fierce" and "independent" image in the industry's girl group scene.

Background and release

2NE1 was first unveiled to the public on March 27, 2009 after appearing alongside labelmate BigBang for the LG Cyon promotional track "Lollipop". Despite the track not having any formal promotions on music shows, the song became a hit on all offline and online charts in South Korea. On April 30, 2009, CEO of YG Entertainment Yang Hyun-suk revealed that 2NE1's debut song would consist of a hip-hop and reggae concept, to be released via digital download and streaming on May 6, 2009.  The song, titled "Fire", was written and produced by 1TYM's Teddy Park, and gives a "strong and sophisticated feeling". Short clips of the song were teased on the group's official website at the beginning of May.

"Fire" was released as planned on May 6, with two versions of the music video released the same day — a "space" version and a "street" version. Both of the music videos received over one million views in a day; the viewcount then quickly increased to two million.  The videos were profiled on Perez Hilton's blog.

Reception

Critical reception
Writing for webzine IZM, Lee Jong-min said that "'Fire' produced a more evolved image than the previous scene created by the agency", and added that its use of synthesizers and heavy bass sounded like something out of a martial arts movie, generating power that surprises watchers. The publication further wrote that "the development of one or two melodic variations and the electronic sound that dominates the entire song cleverly mixes the hip-hop attitude with club scene musical trends." They named "Fire" one of the best singles of 2009—the only song from an idol group in the list. In webzine Weivs year-end feature ranking the best singles of the year, critic Kim Min-young ranked the song number three while Choi Min-woo ranked it number four on their individual year-end listings.

Retrospectively, Jeff Benjamin of Billboard ranked it the 14th best single in the group's discography, complimenting the group's charisma in addition to the track's "exciting" and "twinkling synthesizers", and wrote that it "set the groundwork for much of the act's future singles -- catchy electro-pop bangers with loads of attitude."

Public reception
Both the song and the group have been very popular online, with the song topping Mnet's online chart and the group's name becoming a top search term.  The group was also rewarded with three Cyworld Digital Music Awards, with both "Lollipop" and "Fire" winning "Song of the Month" awards and the group winning "Rookie of the Month" for May 2009.

Awards

Music video and promotion
The "Space" version of the music video showcases 2NE1 performing the song in Space. During the intro, CL is also seen wearing Beats by Dr. Dre headphones. The "Street" version of the music video features 2NE1 performing "Fire" on an abandoned street at night. The video also features a cameo appearance by G-Dragon of Big Bang. Both versions of the music video were filmed in secret during April 2009. The music videos were released May 6, 2009, both being directed by Seo Hyun-seung. Both versions were uploaded on YG's official YouTube account on August 17, 2009. The space version has since accumulated over 52 million views on the platform. A behind the scenes video was released May 10, 2009.

The group's first performance of the song was on May 17, 2009, on SBS's Inkigayo, beginning the group's activities. The performance was featured on Perez Hilton's blog, once again showing his interest towards the group. 2NE1 went on to win two "Mutizen" awards from the music program; their first win on June 14 set a record at the time for the fastest group to receive a music show win—just 39 days after their debut. Both of the official music videos were uploaded in HD on the YouTube channel of 2NE1 on September 6, 2010.

Legacy 
In 2014, webzine Music Taste Y included "Fire" in their list of 120 greatest dance tracks of all-time: music critic Hong Hyuk-soo wrote that "Fire" may have been a kind of feminism that revolted against the music market that goes back and forth between innocence and sexy; "a gesture of one-dimensional rebellion against the social convention that says, 'Because you are a woman, you have to be careful.'" South China Morning Posts Patti Sunio hailed the "instant hit" as the track "that broke the cutesy clean-cut look typical of girl groups." In 2020, Globe Telecom named "Fire" one of the most iconic K-pop music videos, saying that the "bold video style coupled with the pulsing synths made a refreshing addition to the existing lineup of bubblegum pop female acts." It was ranked number 37 in Melon and newspaper Seoul Shinmuns 2021 list of Top K-pop Songs of All Time, where music critic Squib wrote that the flame of the "new evolution" that "Fire" ignited can be still seen in the genealogy of girl groups that claim strong images in the present, ranging from 4Minute to most recently Blackpink and Itzy. Insider named it one of the best debut songs of all time in K-pop, writing that it "opens with one of the most iconic spoken lines in any K-pop track".

Track listing 
Digital download / streaming
 "Fire" – 3:43

Release history

Notes

References

External links
 
 

2009 debut singles
2009 songs
2NE1 songs
Dancehall songs
Korean-language songs
YG Entertainment singles
Songs written by Teddy Park